Athirty4 (or sometimes known as @Athirty4, or A34 in a number of press articles) is a pseudonymous British-based, multi-disciplined street artist, whose artwork comprises plaster of Paris, photography, graphic design and illustration. His identity is unknown.

Notable Works 

Athirty4's first publicly acknowledged piece appeared in March 2018 when he added some fictional fantasy names to road signs in Didcot, Oxfordshire. The names that he added included Gotham City, Emerald City, Middle Earth, Neverland, and Narnia. Athirty4 said that he added the names so that people would no longer think of Didcot as the most boring town in England. The signs were not received favourably by the Didcot council. Initially, there was speculation as to who had created the signs, as Athirty4 had left no clues that it was he who was behind the altered road signs.

In May 2018, Athirty4 created a series of social media-inspired street signs, and added them to streets and roads in Oxford. His signs were a comment about misuse of personal data by a number of social media companies. He said, "Our relationship with social media is like a modern gothic tale. The social media companies sucking data from us like vampires drinking blood."

In the same month, he used an abandoned washing machine, which he found in an Oxford underpass, and turned it into a readymade by means of placing a printed statement above the machine. The statement read, "Please use this washing machine to cleanse your mind of all prejudices and negative preconceptions relating to contemporary art. The work triggered a debate as to whether it represented a piece of art or was merely an act of fly-tipping.

The theme of Brexit has cropped up in several of Athirty4's artworks. Two pieces appeared in June 2018: a large mural on a bridge at Radley railway station, and a photographic piece, featuring Jean Claude Juncker, on the side of a derelict building in Oxford. And in 2019, Athirty4 revisited the subject when he created over a hundred hand-made, misshapen plaster of Paris milk bottles, and subsequently left them on people's doorsteps in a handful of towns across Oxfordshire and Berkshire. The misshapen bottles were a metaphor for the type of post-Brexit trade deals that the UK government was considering at the time.
 
An Oxford McDonald's fast food franchise attracted the attention of Athirty4 in 2018. He applied a large satirical graphic on the front window of a shop next to the McDonald's on Cornmarket Street in the centre of Oxford. The window graphic comprised imagery that criticised McDonald's for using unsustainable palm oil in its food.

In October 2019, a series of plaster of Paris light switches appeared in Oxford. There was speculation as to what the artwork meant, as there was no explanation accompanying the light switches.

The Coronavirus gave Athirty4 the opportunity to create a number of artworks relating to the subject. One in particular saw him produce a collection of handcrafted kites, which he placed in dozens of trees on Stapleton Road, opposite the Jenner Institute, where the Oxford AstraZeneca Covid 19 vaccine was being created. Each kite carried a note on the end of their tale, which stated, "The Covid-19 vaccine is a gust of hope that will help to free us from the trees." Athirty4 also created an installation outside a Boots the chemist shop; mocking people who were panic buying toilet rolls.
An environmental theme also popped up in one of Athirty4's works, with a project called 'Vocal Gnomes', comprising hand-made garden gnomes, each one carrying an environment message on a placard. The gnomes were left in privately owned front gardens, where the owners had concreted over their lawns in order to provide space for their cars.In November 2021, he initiated a project called BlackThursday21, which was a direct criticism of Black Friday. His project saw him hang dozens of black canvases, with humorous statements embossed on them, in public places in Banbury, Littlemore, Abingdon, Cowley and Kidlington (the first letters of each place name spelling the word 'BLACK'), aimed to inspire other artists to create artworks to give away for free. "The antithesis of Black Friday," Athirty4 stated.

One of his most recent works, called Product Placement, focused on the subject of litter. He created a wooden bin and filled it with hand-crafted plaster of Paris objects, all based on real pieces of litter that he'd picked up during his time as a litter picker. He erected the bin on St. Giles, Oxford.  He also placed the remainder of his litter-inspired plaster of Paris artworks on pavements and roads in Oxford, and a number of other cities. Speaking about the project, he said, "We're all so used to seeing litter on our streets, a permanent tide mark, if you like, that it will be hard for people to differentiate my artworks from real litter."

During July 2022, Athirty4 screwed a full-size lifebuoy to a wooden hoarding on Catte Street, Oxford, which drew attention to the UK's cost of living crisis. Above the lifebuoy a sign read: “If you are drowning in the cost of living crisis, the government would like to offer you this lifebuoy ring to help you keep your head above the water. Note: you must provide your own screwdriver to remove the lifebuoy ring from its location.”

References 

British artists
Street artists
Anonymous artists
English contemporary artists
Guerilla artists